Luis Alberto Acuña Gatillon (1927 in Iquique – 2005) was a Chilean writer and storyteller par excellence born in Iquique. He was Professor of applied chemistry, and taught at the former State Technical University for 26 years until his exoneration for political reasons.

Works
Books

La Revancha (The revenge). Stories. Santiago, 1960.
Contrabando (Contraband). Stories. Santiago, 1962.
La Noche Larga (The Long Night). Stories. Santiago, 1967.
Jarrón de Porcelana China (Chinese Porcelain Vase). Stories. Santiago, 1979.
Carmelo se fue a la Guerra (Carmelo went to war). Stories. Santiago, 1995.
Hable y Escriba Mejor (Speak and write better). Original Compendium of grammar. Santiago, 2000.
Píldoras para el Estrés (Pills for stress). Maxims and epigrams. Santiago, 2001.

Unpublished works
¿Dónde está tu hermano? (Where is your brother). Radio drama.
Escultor del Tiempo (Sculptor of time). Poems.

Inclusion in anthologies
Cuentos humorísticos de autores chilenos (Humorous tales from Chilean authors). Javier Rodríguez Lefebre. Santiago, 1965
Encuentro (Encounter). Santiago, 1984. 
Antología del cuento chileno (Anthology of Chilean short story). Enrique Lafourcade. Santiago, 1985. 
¡Y Por qué no! (And why not!). National NO Campaign. Santiago, 1988.
I racconti piu brevi del Cile (More short stories of Chile). Gianni Toti. Roma, 1997.

In film
El Leyton, Chilean film by Gonzalo Justiniano, based on the story La Red from the book La Noche Larga.

Prizes and awards
Winner of various literary prizes including the following:

Major Chilean awards
Premio Municipal de Cuento (Municipal Prize for Story), 1980.
 Gabriela Mistral Poetic Festival Prize, 1974. 
 Alerce Award, Society of Chilean Writers, 1978. 
 Daniel de la Vega Prize, Las Últimas Noticias newspaper, 1993.

International award
 Honorable Mention -2nd prize for unpublished short-story, Ibero-American story-writing contest, Association of Critics and Commentators of Arts. Miami, U.S.A., 1976.

Bibliography and External links
 Escritores.cl
 Diccionario de Literatura Chilena (Dictionary of Chilean Literature), Efraín Szmulevic, 1st Edition, 1978; 2nd Edition,1984; 3rd Edition, 1998.
 Chilean Writers Society
 TVN.cl
 Jarrón de Porcelana China
 Camina por Atacama
 El Caupe
 La Costra
 La Red

1927 births
2005 deaths
People from Iquique
Chilean male short story writers
20th-century Chilean short story writers